Jiří Čtvrtečka (born December 2, 1942) is a Czechoslovak sprint canoer who competed from the late 1960s to the late 1970s. He won three medals at the ICF Canoe Sprint World Championships with a silver (C-2 500 m: 1975) and two bronzes (C-1 1000 m: 1970, C-2 500 m: 1974).

Čtvrtečka also competed in three Summer Olympics, earning his best finish of fourth in the C-1 1000 m event at Mexico City in 1968.

References

 Sports-reference.com profile

1942 births
Canoeists at the 1968 Summer Olympics
Canoeists at the 1972 Summer Olympics
Canoeists at the 1976 Summer Olympics
Czechoslovak male canoeists
Czech male canoeists
Living people
Olympic canoeists of Czechoslovakia
ICF Canoe Sprint World Championships medalists in Canadian